Vincent Lachambre (born 6 November 1980) is a retired Belgian footballer.

Career
He spent for nine seasons at Dutch club Roda JC. Lachambre is a defender who was born in Brussels and made his debut in professional football, being part of the KRC Harelbeke squad in the 2000–01 season. He also played for Eerste Divisie side FC Eindhoven before joining Roda JC for the second time in his career.

References

External links

Vincent Lachambre at Football-direct

1980 births
Living people
Belgian footballers
Belgium youth international footballers
Belgium under-21 international footballers
R.W.D. Molenbeek players
Roda JC Kerkrade players
FC Eindhoven players
Belgian Pro League players
Challenger Pro League players
Eerste Divisie players
Eredivisie players
Belgian expatriate footballers
K.V.K. Tienen-Hageland players
Footballers from Brussels
Association football defenders
K.R.C. Zuid-West-Vlaanderen players
Belgian expatriate sportspeople in the Netherlands
Expatriate footballers in the Netherlands